Amul is an Indian dairy cooperative.

Amul may also refer to:
 Āmul, old name of Amol, a city in Iran
 Āmul, old name of Türkmenabat, a city in Turkmenistan
 Amul, the protagonist of the 1987 game Dragon Spirit
 Amul Thapar, American jurist

See also 
 Amol (disambiguation)
 aMule